Udaipur Municipal Corporation  is the municipal corporation of Udaipur city in Rajasthan state of India. The corporation has 70 ( BJP-44, congress-20,others-6 ) municipal wards and Govind Singh Taunk is the mayor. The city had city council that was converted into municipal corporation in 2013. Budget of 2018-2019 of Udaipur Municipal Corporation was 254.5 Cr.

References

Government of Udaipur
Municipal corporations in Rajasthan
Local government in Rajasthan
2013 establishments in Rajasthan